George O'Brien (born 3 January 1935) is a British racing cyclist. He rode in the 1961 Tour de France.

References

1935 births
Living people
British male cyclists
Sportspeople from Liverpool